Florian Vachon (born 2 January 1985) is a French former professional road bicycle racer, who rode professionally between 2008 and 2020, for the , and / teams.

Major results

2005
 2nd Championat d'Auvergne
2006
 2nd Circuit des 2 ponts Montluçon
2007
 Tour du Haut-Anjou
1st Points classification
1st Stages 3 & 4
 1st Circuit Boussaquin
 2nd Paris–Tours Espoirs
 3rd Ronde du Pays Basque
 8th Road race, UCI Under-23 Road World Championships
 8th Road race, UCI European Under-23 Road Championships
2008
 1st Izegem
 2nd Beuvry la Forêt
 6th Tour de Vendée
2009
 1st Stage 3 Tour du Gévaudan Languedoc-Roussillon
 4th Tour de Vendée
 6th Grand Prix de la Ville de Lillers
 8th Le Samyn
 8th Tro-Bro Léon
 9th Grand Prix de la ville de Pérenchies
 10th Grand Prix de la Somme
2010
 1st Tour du Finistère
 1st Stage 1 Route du Sud
 1st Stage 3b Circuit des Ardennes
 2nd Grand Prix de Denain
 5th Tro-Bro Léon
 7th Cholet-Pays de Loire
 7th Tour de Vendée
 8th Grand Prix de la Somme
 9th Châteauroux Classic
2011
 3rd Overall Ronde de l'Oise
 4th Polynormande
 9th Flèche d'Emeraude
2012
 1st Classic Loire Atlantique
 1st Paris–Bourges
 1st Stage 1 Critérium International
 9th Overall Paris–Corrèze
 9th Grand Prix de la ville de Pérenchies
2013
 2nd Overall Four Days of Dunkirk
 3rd Overall Boucles de la Mayenne
 4th Grand Prix de Wallonie
 9th Tro-Bro Léon
2014
 1st Classic Sud-Ardèche
2015
 2nd Overall Tour de l'Ain
 4th Overall Tour du Limousin
 4th Kampioenschap van Vlaanderen
 6th Tro-Bro Léon
 8th Overall Four Days of Dunkirk
 8th Overall Tour de Luxembourg
2016
 3rd Tro-Bro Léon
 6th Overall La Méditerranéenne
2017
 7th Overall Settimana Internazionale di Coppi e Bartali
2020
 1st Grand Prix de la Ville de Lillers

Grand Tour general classification results timeline

References

External links

Bretagne-Schuller profile

French male cyclists
1985 births
Living people
People from Montluçon
Sportspeople from Allier
Cyclists from Auvergne-Rhône-Alpes